Steineridrilus is a genus of annelids belonging to the family Histriobdellidae.

Species:
 Steineridrilus cirolanae

References

Annelids